Sir Edward Christopher Evans-Lombe (10 April 1937 – 20 May 2022) was a British High Court judge and landowner.

Early life and education 
Evans-Lombe was the son of Sir Edward Evans-Lombe and his wife Diana. He was educated at Eton and studied at Trinity College, Cambridge, receiving a Master of Arts degree.

Career 
He was called to the bar at the Inner Temple in 1963 and practised bankruptcy law. In 1978, he took silk and served as a recorder from 1982 until 1993.

High Court appointment 
In 1993, he was appointed a judge of the High Court, receiving the customary knighthood in the same year, and was assigned to the Chancery Division. He served in the Competition Appeal Tribunal from 2004. He retired from the High Court and the Tribunal in 2008. At the High Court, he settled the dispute over Mark Birley's £104 million estate and a £54 million dispute over the family distribution of shares in Pataks.

Personal life 
In 1964, he married Frances MacKenzie. They had a son and a daughter. In addition to practice, he ran the Norfolk estate that had been in his family for several generations. On 20 May 2022, he died of heart disease, aged 85.

References 

1937 births
2022 deaths
21st-century English judges
Knights Bachelor
Alumni of Trinity College, Cambridge
Chancery Division judges
Members of the Inner Temple
People educated at Eton College